Charles Lee Feinberg (June 12, 1909 – August 22, 1995) was an American biblical scholar and professor of Semitics and Old Testament. He was an authority on the Jewish history, languages and customs of the Old Testament and biblical prophecies.

Background and education
Feinberg was born in Pittsburgh, Pennsylvania and raised in an Orthodox Jewish community, graduating from the Hebrew Institute of Pittsburgh and the University of Pittsburgh in preparation to be a rabbi. In 1930, he converted from Judaism to Protestantism through the ministry of Chosen People Ministries. He went on to earn his Th.M. (1934) and Th.D. (1935) from Dallas Theological Seminary, his A.M. (1943) from Southern Methodist University and his Ph.D. (1945) in Archaeology and Semitic languages from Johns Hopkins University. Feinberg married Anne Priscilla Fraiman in 1935, and together they had three children (Paul, Lois and John).

Career
Feinberg joined the faculty of Dallas Theological Seminary as professor of Old Testament in 1934 and began radio broadcasting messages the following year. During that time, he also served as pastor of a church from 1936 to 1940. In 1948, Feinberg joined the faculty of what would later become Talbot Theological Seminary, and in 1952 became its first and longest-serving dean. He also served as pastor at two Los Angeles churches until 1955. In 1958, he oversaw an update to The Fundamentals, a defense of the central teachings of Christianity, and later was on the team that originally translated the New American Standard Bible.

In 1981, a Festschrift was published in his honor. Tradition and Testament : Essays in Honor of Charles Lee Feinberg included contributions from John F. Walvoord, Bruce K. Waltke, Walter C. Kaiser Jr., and Gleason L. Archer.

Works

Books

 - First-2d ed. published under title: Premillennialism or amillennialism?
 - previous editions published under title: Israel in the Spotlight

 - Updated ed. of: Fundamentals for Today

Articles and chapters

Festschrift

References

1909 births
1995 deaths
20th-century American Jews
20th-century American translators
20th-century evangelicals
American biblical scholars
Biola University faculty
Converts to Evangelicalism from Judaism
Dallas Theological Seminary alumni
Jewish translators of the Bible
Johns Hopkins University alumni
Old Testament scholars
Southern Methodist University alumni
Translators of the Bible into English